Sophie Green is a contemporary English artist, environmentalist and conservationist based in East Sussex, South East England, known for her hyper-realistic animal paintings.

Early life 

Green was born on 28 February 1992 and grew up in Surrey, South East England. As a child, she suffered from selective mutism, an anxiety disorder manifesting in an inability to speak. Green told BBC Radio 4's Woman's Hour that as a child suffering from selective mutism, she sought solace in nature and art. At the age of 19, Green's mother passed away from cancer. Green went on to study at the University of Brighton, England, where she gained a First Class Bachelor of Arts degree.

Career 

Green paints hyper-realistic paintings of wildlife and uses art to raise awareness and money for conservation issues. Green's artwork was displayed at the 2021 United Nations Climate Change Conference in Glasgow. In 2022, Green's painting of an African elephant, 'Broken', sold at auction in New York City for $24,000, all of which she donated to community and wildlife conservation projects in Africa. Green's painting of 'Wounda' the chimpanzee, later sold at auction at the Royal Geographical Society in London for $24,000, which was donated to the Jane Goodall Institute. In 2021, Green went on an expedition to the Arctic, a trip which inspired her 2022 solo exhibition 'Impermanence'; a collection of paintings of some of the most vulnerable species in the world, which exhibited at the Oxo Tower in London.

Awards 

 Medal of Excellence from the Artists for Conservation Foundation.
 Winner of the Leisure Painter People’s Choice (x2)
 Selected to exhibit artwork at COP26 in 2021.
 Shortlisted as the 'Wildlife Artist of the Year' in association with the David Shepherd Wildlife Foundation and went on to co-host the event in 2022.

References 

East Sussex

1992 births
English artists
English women artists
Living people
People from South East England
20th-century English women artists
Alumni of the University of Brighton